Niska may refer to:

Arts and entertainment
 Adelei Niska, a Firefly character
 Niska Elster, a character in TV series Humans

People
 Nisga’a people, an Indigenous people of British Columbia, Canada
 Nisga’a language
 Niska (rapper) (Georges Stanislas Malif Dinga-Pinto, born 1994), a French rapper 
 Algoth Niska (1888–1954), Finnish bootlegger and adventurer
 Maralin Niska (1926–2016), American operatic soprano
 Bodil Niska (born 1954), Norwegian jazz saxophonist

Places
 Niesky or Niska, Lusatia, Germany
 Niska Isle, Niskayuna, New York, U.S.

Other uses
Niska Gas Storage Partners, a global gas storage service provider

See also

 Niška Banja, a city municipalities in Niš, Serbia

Language and nationality disambiguation pages